Greyhound is a 2020 American war film directed by Aaron Schneider and starring Tom Hanks, who also wrote the screenplay. The film is based on the 1955 novel The Good Shepherd by C. S. Forester, and also stars Stephen Graham, Rob Morgan, and Elisabeth Shue. 

The film follows a commander in the US Navy on his assignment commanding a multi-national escort destroyer group of four defending an Allied convoy of thirty-seven merchant and troop ships. They come under attack by German U-boats in early 1942 during the Battle of the Atlantic, only a few months after the United States officially entered World War II.

Greyhound was initially scheduled to be theatrically released in the United States on June 12, 2020, by Sony Pictures Releasing, but was eventually canceled due to the COVID-19 pandemic after previously being delayed indefinitely. The distribution rights were then sold to Apple TV+, which released the film digitally on July 10, 2020. It received positive reviews from critics, with praise for the action sequences and effective use of its 90-minute runtime. At the 93rd Academy Awards, the film earned a nomination for Best Sound. A sequel is in production.

Plot
During the Battle of the Atlantic, convoy HX-25, consisting of 37 Allied ships, is making its way to Liverpool. The convoy's escort consists of the  USS Keeling (DD-548), radio call sign "Greyhound", captained by Commander Ernest Krause of the United States Navy; the British Tribal-class destroyer HMS James F80, call sign "Harry"; the Polish Grom-class destroyer ORP Viktor H34, call sign "Eagle"; and the Canadian , HMCS Dodge K136, call sign "Dicky". Krause is overall commander of the escort ships, but despite his seniority and extensive naval education, it is his first wartime command.

The convoy enters the "Black Pit", the Mid-Atlantic gap, where they will be out of range of protective air cover. High-frequency direction finding from the convoy flagship intercepts several German transmissions, indicating the presence of U-boats. Greyhound identifies a surfaced sub heading towards the convoy and moves to attack. The U-boat tries to slip under Greyhound, but Krause maneuvers his destroyer above the sub and sinks it with a full pattern of depth charges.

The crew's jubilation is cut short when they receive reports of distress rockets at the rear of the convoy. A Greek merchant ship was attacked by another U-boat and quickly sinks. Krause moves Greyhound to assist, and with careful maneuvering evades torpedoes fired at his ship. The surviving Greek sailors are rescued, and Greyhound returns to the convoy just as the bridge receives multiple messages from the other escorts: a wolfpack consisting of six U-boats is staying just out of firing range of the convoy; Krause suspects they are waiting for nightfall, when the escorts will have zero visibility. The attack commences that evening with five merchant ships being torpedoed and sunk. One U-boat torpedoes an oil tanker and escapes Greyhound by using an underwater decoy device, tricking the ship's sonar into wasting most of their remaining depth charges. Krause chooses to rescue survivors from the burning oil tanker first before going to the aid of the other ships. This decision results in the loss of a cargo ship.

The next day, the wolfpack targets Greyhound. A member of a U-boat's crew, identifying himself as Grey Wolf, taunts the convoy and its escorts via radio transmission. Krause learns that Greyhound is now down to only six depth charges. The U-boats repeatedly torpedo runs, which Greyhound is barely able to evade. Greyhound and Dicky combine their attacks to sink one of the U-boats using surface broadsides. Dicky receives minor damage due to the close range combat, and Greyhound is hit on its port side by the U-boat's deck gun, killing Krause's mess attendant, George Cleveland, and two other sailors. During a funeral service that follows, Eagle is attacked and later sinks. Aware that he might compromise the remaining defenders, Krause elects to break radio silence by transmitting the single word "help" to the Admiralty.

With the convoy close to reaching air cover, the remaining U-boats mount an all-out assault on the surviving destroyers. After heavy fighting, Greyhound sinks the lead U-boat with a full broadside. Air support deployed from British RAF Coastal Command arrives and Greyhound fires, marking the last visible U-boat location, allowing a PBY Catalina to depth-charge and sink the sub. The two surviving wolfpack subs quickly flee.

While assessing damage, Krause receives radio contact from the head of the relief escorts, HMS Diamond, that they have arrived and Greyhound and the other two destroyers are due for repair and refitting in Derry. The crew receives a "job well done" on their four U-boat kills. While setting the new course, passengers and crew of the remaining convoy ships cheer Greyhound's crew, after which Krause is able to retire to his cabin and finally sleep.

Cast
 Tom Hanks as Commander Krause
 Elisabeth Shue as Evelyn
 Stephen Graham as Charlie Cole
 Matt Helm as Lt. Nystrom
 Craig Tate as Pitts
 Rob Morgan as Cleveland
 Manuel Garcia-Rulfo as Melvin Lopez
 Karl Glusman as Red Eppstein
 Tom Brittney as Lieutenant Watson
 Joseph Henry Poliquin V as Lee Helmsman #1 “Forbrick”
 Devin Druid as Homer Wallace
 Grayson Russell as Signalman #1
 Dave Davis as Boatswain's Mate #1
 Michael Benz as Lieutenant Carling
 Josh Wiggins as Talker #1
 Chet Hanks as Bushnell
 Ian James Corlett as captain of HMCS Dodge, call sign "Dicky" (voice)
 Maximilian Osinski as captain of ORP Viktor, call sign "Eagle" (voice)
 Dominic Keating as captain of HMS James, call sign "Harry" (voice)
 Thomas Kretschmann as Grey Wolf (voice)

Production
Pre-production photography took place in January 2018 at sea aboard HMCS Montréal, a frigate of the Royal Canadian Navy. HMCS Sackville, the last surviving Flower-class corvette, was used as the model for the film's corvette, HMCS Dodge (call sign "Dicky"). Producers took numerous 3D scans of the restored ship's exterior at Halifax, Nova Scotia to create the CGI version of the corvette. In March 2018 filming commenced aboard USS Kidd in Baton Rouge, Louisiana.

Release
Greyhound was initially scheduled to be theatrically released in the United States by Sony Pictures Releasing under its Columbia Pictures label on March 22, 2019, before being delayed to May 8, 2020, and finally June 12, 2020.

Like many other films, it was removed from the release schedule in March 2020 due to the COVID-19 pandemic in the United States. Hanks himself had been diagnosed with COVID-19 earlier that month while filming Elvis for Warner Bros. In May 2020, it was announced Apple TV+ had acquired distribution rights to the film for about $70 million; Stage 6 Films was left as the sole Sony distributor as of the release of the film. It was released digitally by the service on July 10, 2020. Apple said that the film had the biggest debut weekend of any program in the platform's history, with Deadline Hollywood saying the figures were "commensurate with a summer theatrical box office big hit". In November, Variety reported the film was the 24th-most watched straight-to-streaming title of 2020 up to that point.

Greyhound is available on Apple TV+.

Reception
The website's critics consensus reads: "Greyhounds characters aren't as robust as its action sequences, but this fast-paced World War II thriller benefits from its efficiently economical approach". On Metacritic, the film has a weighted average score of 64 out of 100, based on 37 critics, indicating "generally favorable reviews".

Owen Gleiberman, in his review for Variety, said the film is "less a drama than a tense and sturdy diary of the logistics of battle" and "though much of the action is set in the open air of the ship's command perch, Greyhound often feels like a submarine thriller: tense, tight, boxed-in". Writing for the Chicago Tribune, Michael Phillips gave the film three out of four stars and said: "Like the canine, [Greyhound is] trim, narrow of scope, and it runs efficiently and well despite a barrage of on-screen time stamps and vessel identification markers".

David Ehrlich of IndieWire gave the film a "C−" and wrote: "A terse and streamlined dad movie that's shorter than a Sunday afternoon nap and just as exciting, Greyhound bobs across the screen like a nuanced character study that's been entombed in a 2,000-ton iron casket and set adrift over the Atlantic. The film offers a handful of brief hints at the tortured hero who Forester invented for his book ... but the whole thing is far too preoccupied with staying afloat to profile the guy at the helm in any meaningful way".

Accolades

References

External links
 
 
 
 
 Greyhound at History vs. Hollywood

2020 films
2020 war drama films
American war drama films
Apple TV+ original films
FilmNation Entertainment films
Playtone films
Stage 6 Films films
Films postponed due to the COVID-19 pandemic
Films not released in theaters due to the COVID-19 pandemic
Films directed by Aaron Schneider
Films produced by Gary Goetzman
Films scored by Blake Neely
Films set in 1941
Films set in 1942
Films set in San Francisco
Films shot in Louisiana
Films with screenplays by Tom Hanks
Films based on British novels
Films based on works by C. S. Forester
Films about the United States Navy in World War II
World War II films based on actual events
World War II submarine films
U-boat fiction
2020s English-language films
Films set on ships
2020s American films
Films about the United States Navy